Roberto Bergamaschi (born 7 September 1960 in Cassano d'Adda, Province of Milan) is an Italian former footballer who made more than 400 professional appearances, including 77 in Serie A for Brescia, Inter and Genoa.

References

1960 births
Living people
People from Cassano d'Adda
Italian footballers
Association football midfielders
Serie A players
Inter Milan players
Pisa S.C. players
Brescia Calcio players
Genoa C.F.C. players
Cagliari Calcio players
S.S.D. Città di Brindisi players
A.C. Reggiana 1919 players
Spezia Calcio players
Serie B players
A.S.D. Fanfulla players
Footballers from Lombardy
Sportspeople from the Metropolitan City of Milan